Lexington station may refer to:

Lexington Depot, a former railway station in Lexington, Massachusetts
Lexington station (North Carolina), an Amtrak station in Lexington, North Carolina
Lexington station (Rochester), a former rapid transit station in Rochester, New York
Lexington Avenue–63rd Street (63rd Street lines), a New York City Subway station in Manhattan; serving the  train
Lexington Parkway station, a light rail station in Saint Paul, Minnesota

See also
Lexington Market station (disambiguation)